The 2021–22 Red Star Belgrade season was the club's 16th in the Serbian SuperLiga and 76th consecutive season in the top flight of Yugoslav and Serbian football. The club participated in the Serbian SuperLiga, Serbian Cup, UEFA Europa League and qualifications for UEFA Champions League.

Summary

Pre-season
The first signing for the new season was Austrian international Aleksandar Dragović who came in as a free agent from Germany where he spent last four and a half seasons playing for Bayer Leverkusen. Dragović, who also holds Serbian citizenship and therefore will not be counted as a foreign player in Serbian SuperLiga, signed three-year contract on 26 May 2021. Dragović was also only member of the club's squad that was selected in the final squad of his national team for the UEFA Euro 2020. He was starter in all 4 matches Austria played, being in the end eliminated in round of 16 by Italy.

The first departure was Nemanja Milunović who left the club after his two and a half season contract signed in December 2018 expired. During his spell at the club he played 87 matches in all competitions and scored 9 goals. He left the club to join Turkish side Alanyaspor as a free agent after winning three domestic titles and one domestic cup with Red Star.

On 7 June 2021 Željko Gavrić, who is a product of club's academy, made his international debut for Serbia national football team in a friendly match against Jamaica. Match ended in a 1–1 draw and he was a starter, being substituted at half time.

On 10 June 2021 Aleksandar Katai, who arrived at the club and was one of the best players in the previous season, signed a new three-years contract extending his second spell at the club until summer of 2024.

Red Star officially started their pre-season with medical checks on 22 June 2021 on their home ground in Belgrade. Training camp will move to Austrian town Stegersbach between 24 June and 9 July 2021. Four friendly matches were played in Austria, against GAK, Aris, Argeș Pitești and Sturm Graz.

On 23 June 2021 Srđan Babić signed a new two-years contract until summer of 2023. He arrived in Red Star in summer of 2017 and spent previous season on loan at Portuguese side Famalicão.

On 24 June 2021 club announced that they would not be buying out contract of an Italian striker Diego Falcinelli. He spent previous season in the club on the loan from Italian side Bologna, scoring 13 goals. Club also announced that four young players were recalled from their loans and added to the first squad for the summer training camp: Lazetić, Matić and Nikola Stanković from Grafičar and Gordić from Mačva Šabac. After the end of summer training camp Matić was returned to Grafičar on another loan.

July
On 1 July 2021 Red Star brought back Nenad Krstičić from Greek side AEK Athens. He spent his first spell at the club between 2017 and 2019 during which he played 64 games and scored 6 goals. Krstičić signed two-years contract with the club. On the same date club also signed young midfielder Petar Stanić from Železničar Pančevo. He signed a four-years contract.

On 3 July 2021 club announced that they signed three-years contract with Norwegian international forward Ohi Omoijuanfo. He will join the club for free at the end of his current contract with Norwegian side Molde in January 2022.

On 5 July 2021 two more signings were announced. First one was Serbian under-21 international Milan Ilić who arrived from Loznica after his previous contract expired. He signed three-years contract with the club, and was later loaned back to Loznica. Second signing was French striker Loïs Diony. He arrived on one-year loan from Ligue 1 side Angers SCO with 1.2 million euros buyout option.

Serbian SuperLiga started on 16 July with home game against Vojvodina which ended in goalless draw with newcomer Dragović making a debut. By the end of the month Red Star played another home game against Mladost winning 1–0 and away game at Spartak winning 3–1 with a goalkeeper Miloš Gordić making a debut.

Red Star started their European season on 21 July 2021 in second qualifying round of UEFA Champions League. Draw for that round was held on 16 June 2021 and Red Star was drawn to play against Kazak champion Kairat who were the winners of first qualifying round fixture against Israeli champion Maccabi Haifa. This was the third time in history that Red Star and Kairat played against each other. Last time they played in 2015–16 Europa League qualifications, in fixtures that was won by Kairat. Red Star won the fixture 6–2 on aggregate, with first leg played in Kazakhstan ending in Kairat's victory 2–1 and second leg played in Belgrade ending in Red Star's 5–0 victory.

August
During the August club played three matches in Serbian Superliga against Napredak, TSC and Čukarički winning all three of them, extending their unbeaten run since the start of the season to 6 games and winning run to 5 games. In last of those matches, against Čukarički, Petar Stanić made his debut for the club after coming in as a substitution.

In the third qualifying round of UEFA Champions League Red Star was drawn against Moldovan champion Sheriff Tiraspol who previously eliminated Armenian champion Alashkert. Fixture ended with Red Star being eliminated 1–2 on aggregate. First fixture was played on 3 August in Belgrade and ended in 1–1 draw, and second one was played on 10 August in Tiraspol and ended in 1–0 defeat. This was the first time in history that these two side played each other.

After being eliminated from the UEFA Champions League Red Star was transferred to 2021–22 UEFA Europa League play-off round. They were drawn to play against Romanian champions CFR Cluj who were previously also eliminated from Champions League by Swiss champion Young Boys. This was the first time in history that these two side played each other. Red Star won 6–2 on aggregate and qualified for the Europa League group stage for a second year in a row. First leg was played on 19 August in Belgrade and ended in 4–0 win for the club, while second leg was played on 26 August in Cluj-Napoca and ended in 2–1 win. In the first match Comorian forward Ben scored his 14th goal for the Red Star in international competitions making him top foreign scorer in the history of the club and fifth overall.

In draw that took place on 27 August in Istanbul Red Star was drawn to play in Europa League Group F together with Portuguese Cup winner Braga, Bulgarian champion Ludogorets Razgrad and Danish vice champion Midtjylland. This will be third time that club will play against Braga, second time against Ludogorets and first time against Midtjylland. Matches in the group stage will be played between September and December.

On 12 August, two days after being eliminated from the UEFA Champions League, club sold young winger Željko Gavrić to Hungarian champions Ferencvárosi for an estimated fee of €1.2 million.

On 13 August 2021 Milan Pavkov extended his contract with Red Star to the summer of 2024.

On 30 August 2021 Serbian defender Srđan Babić was loaned to the Segunda División side Almería with a buy out option at the end of the season. On the same day club signed Dutch forward Richairo Živković. Former Netherlands under-21 international player arrived from Chinese side Changchun Yatai and signed three-years contract.

September
During the September's international window Red Star had 4 first team players who received call-ups for their national teams to play in the 2022 FIFA World Cup qualification. Goalkeeper Milan Borjan made three caps for Canada and conceded two goals. Defender Miloš Degenek was part of the Australian team but failed to make an appearance, while another defender Aleksandar Dragović made two more caps for Austria making him second most capped player in the history of Austria. And Guélor Kanga made two caps for the Gabon. Besides those four players Ben made two more caps for Comores in friendly games scoring a hat-trick in one of them, Miloš Gordić, Strahinja Eraković, Nikola Stanković and Marko Lazetić represented Serbian youth teams and Richard Odada who plays on a loan at Metalac made his international debut for Kenya.

Three matches were played in Serbian SuperLiga. In the first of them, 3–0 victory against Proleter on 11 September, Richairo Živković made his debut for the club coming in as a half time substitution. Aleksandar Katai scored two goals in the same match which earned him the title of the player of the round. On 19 September first Eternal derby of the season was played in an away game against clubs arch rivals Partizan. This was 165th time that those two teams clashed against each other in the league, and 203rd in total. Match ended in 1–1 draw, with only goal for the Red Star being scored by Aleksandar Katai. In the last match of the month Red Star won an away game against Novi Pazar 4–0.

Club started group stage of the Europa League with a 2–1 home game win against Portuguese side Braga. This was the fourth time these two sides played against each other, and the first time ever that Red Star managed to be victorious. Second group match was an away game against Bulgarian champions Ludogorets Razgrad on 30 September. Match ended with Red Star's 1–0 win. This was the third match between those two sides, and the first that Red Star was victorious.

October
During the October's international window Red Star had three first team players who received call-ups for Serbia national under-21 football team to play in the 2023 UEFA European Under-21 Championship qualification - goalkeeper Miloš Gordić who played both scheduled games and conceded four goals, defender Strahinja Eraković who played one game against Armenia and scored his first goal for Serbia under-21s and midfielder Petar Stanić who failed to make an appearance. Besides those three players Guélor Kanga played two games for the Gabon and Richard Odada played two games for Kenya in 2022 FIFA World Cup qualification.

Only one game was played in Europa League, an away match against Danish side Midtjylland on 21 October. Match ended in a 1-1 draw with only goal being scored by Mirko Ivanić who signed new contract with the club until 2025 just one day after this match. This was first time in history that these two teams played each other.

Besides Ivanić two more players extended their contracts with the club during the October, both products of club's youth academy. Defender Strahinja Eraković extended his contract until summer of 2025 and goalkeeper Miloš Gordić extended his contract until summer of 2023 with an option for another two-years extension.

In Serbian Superliga club played five matches, winning four and losing one game. On 16 October club achieved biggest win of the season 7–1 in an away game against Kolubara. For his performance in this match, in which he had 2 assists, Milan Rodić earned the Superliga's Player of the Week award. On 27 October a 2–1 loss was suffered in a match against Radnik Surdulica. This was first time that the club lost a league game since 2019–20 season, since when they had 51 games undefeated run in the league. This was also the third longest undefeated run in club's history. At the end of the month club was placed second on the league table with 8 points behind their rivals Partizan.

Club was scheduled to start this season of Serbian Cup in the round of 32 on 27 October, but that match was rescheduled to a 18 November. Red Star was drawn to play an away game against Serbian First League side Inđija.

November
During the November's international window Red Star had six players who received call-ups for their national teams and three players who received call-ups for Serbia national under-21 football team. Milan Borjan played two games for Canada in CONCACAF 2022 FIFA World Cup qualification conceding one goal. Miloš Degenek played two games for Australia in AFC 2022 FIFA World Cup qualification. Aleksandar Dragović played two games for Austria in UEFA 2022 FIFA World Cup qualification. Aleksandar Dragović played two games for Austria in UEFA 2022 FIFA World Cup qualification who qualified for UEFA Second Round play-off. Guélor Kanga played one game for Gabon in CAF 2022 FIFA World Cup qualification who were eliminated by finishing second in their qualification group. Ben played one friendly game for Comoros in which he scored two goals. Richard Odada played one game and scored a goal for Kenya in CAF 2022 FIFA World Cup qualification who were eliminated from the qualifications by finishing third in their group. Finally Miloš Gordić, Strahinja Eraković and Petar Stanić received call-up for Serbia national under-21 football team for their 2023 European Under-21 Championship qualification. All three of them played two games for the national youth squad. Seven more players from the youth squad received call-up for Serbia national under-19 football team.

Club played two home games in Europa League. It lost against Midtjylland and defeated Ludogorets. With one game remaining in December Red Star secured European spring for two years in a row and last group stage match in December (away game against Braga) will determine whether it will continue its run in Europe League or be transferred into 2021–22 UEFA Europa Conference League.

In Serbian Superleague only three games were played. Red Star won all three of them with outstanding performance from Aleksandar Katai who scored club's first hat-trick of the season in an away game against Mladost. For this accomplishment he was named Superliga's Player of the Week for the second time this season. Other notable performance was by Ben in a home game against Spartak in which he scored 2 goals and 1 assist also earning the title of the Superliga's Player of the Week. Club again ended the month in the second place, just 3 points shy of Partizan.

Rescheduled game of the first round of Serbian Cup against Inđija was played on 18 November. Red Star was victorious 1–0 with only goal being scored by Richairo Živković. That was his first goal for the club since his arrival this season. In the second round of the competition Red Star was drawn to play a home game against Radnički Niš. Game was originally scheduled to be played on 1 December, but was rescheduled to a later date.

December
Red Star played their final groups stage game in Europa League against Braga in Portugal. They held to a 1–1 draw with only goal being scored from the penalty by Aleksandar Katai. This draw secured them first position in a group and qualified them for the round of 16 of Europa League. This was the first time Red Star finished first in the group stage of Europa League, and the first time they managed to qualify for the round of 16 since the competition was rebranded in 2009.

In Serbian Superleage they played 4 games, winning 3 and drawing 1. They finished winter part of the season in the second place, five points behind Partizan.

On 27 December Gabonese midfielder Guélor Kanga acquired Serbian citizenship after living in the country for more than three years. Because of that he will no longer be considered as a foreign player in Serbian Superleage.

January
Two of the club's players will represent their nations in 2021 Africa Cup of Nations that will be held from 9 January to 6 February. Guélor Kanga will represent Gabon and Ben will represent Comoros. They will both play in Group C together with Morocco and Ghana. Kanga played four games for Gabon, all four as a starter, and in the end was eliminated in Round of 16 by Burkina Faso. Ben also started in four games for Comoros, scoring one goal in the process. They were eliminated in Round of 16 by the competition's hosts Cameroon.

Milan Borjan also received international callup for Canada in third Round of CONCACAF's 2022 FIFA World Cup qualifications. He played three games and had all three clean sheet.

Red Star started their winter training camp on 13 January. First part of it, between 13 and 20 January, was supposed to be held on Cyprus but was canceled. Instead of that entire training camp was held between 13 January and 3 February in Turkey during which four friendly games were played.

At the end of previous month contract expired with two players, Slavoljub Srnić and Aleksa Vukanović. Vukanović left the club as a free agent and Srnić signed new contract until summer of 2023.

On 10 January club terminated contract with Australian international Miloš Degenek ending his second spell with the club. He was with the club for two and a half years. During his two spells at the club he played 132 matches in all competitions and scored three goals winning three domestic leagues and one domestic cup in the process. Degenek signed with MLS side Columbus Crew.

On 12 January club extended contract with Ghanaian forward Ibrahim Mustapha until summer of 2025. Mustapha, who arrived at the club in January 2020, spent previous season and a half on loans at Zlatibor Čajetina and Radnički Sremska Mitrovica.

On 15 January club signed contract with Italian international right back Cristiano Piccini until summer of 2024. Piccini arrived as a free agent from Spanish side Valencia.

On 18 January club signed contract with Serbian wing-back Nikola Glišić until summer of 2024. Glišić arrived from a Serbian First League side IMT and will remain with them on a loan until the end of a 2021–22 season.

On 27 January club sold young forward Marko Lazetić to Italian powerhouse Milan for an estimated fee of €4 million. Lazetić, who is a product of a clubs youth academy, spent previous two seasons at the club winning one double in the process.

On 29 January club sold Serbian defensive midfielder to Spanish side Granada for an estimated fee of €1.5 million. Petrović, who arrived at the club in August 2019 from Rad, played 87 matches for the club in all competitions and scored 3 goals.

February
On 2 February club announced the transfer of German-born Serbian youth international Nemanja Motika. He is a product of Bayern Munich youth academy and was playing for Bayern Munich II in German fourth tier competition Regionalliga Bayern. Estimated fee for this transfer was around €2.5 million and Motika signed with the club until the summer of 2026.

On 7 February club announced that three of the youth players, defender Andrej Đurić and midfielders Nikola Stanković and Andrija Radulović will be recalled from club's affiliate Grafičar and promoted to the first squad. On the same day Ghanaian midfielder Ibrahim Mustapha was loaned out to Serbian SuperLiga side FK Novi Pazar until the end of the season.

During the month club extended contracts with two of its youth players. Serbian goalkeeper Marko Ćopić, who was on loan at Grafičar Beograd since the start of the season, extended his contract with the club until summer of 2024. He'll remain on loan at Grafičar until the end of the season. Serbian defender Stefan Leković signed his first professional contract with the club until summer of 2026. He will also be loaned to Grafičar Beograd until the end of this season.

On 24 February club extended contract with Serbian full back Milan Rodić until summer of 2025. Rodić arrived at the club in summer of 2017 from Russian side Krylia Sovetov and won four Serbian SuperLeagues and one Serbian Cup during his tenuer at the club.

The draw for the UEFA Europa League round of 16 was held on 25 February 2022. Red Star was drawn against Scottish side Rangers. The first leg was played on 10 March, and the second leg was played on 17 March 2022. This was the fourth time in history that these two clubs were drawn to play against each other.

In Serbian SuperLeage they played 3 games, winning all three of them. Highlight of the month was a 2–0 Eternal derby win against their arch-rivals Partizan. They finished February in the second place, two points behind Partizan.

March
Draw for the quarter finals of the Serbian Cup was held on 1 March. Red Star was drawn to play home game against TSC on 6 April.

Club played UEFA Europa League Round of 16 against Scottish side Rangers and lost 4–2 on aggregate. First leg in Glasgow was 3–0 defeat, while rematch in Belgrade ended in Red Star's 2–1 win. El Fardou Ben Nabouhane penalty winner from the second match was his 15th goal for the club in European competitions which brought him to the 5th place on the list of club's top scorers in international competitions. This ended one of the best European seasons for the club in last few decades after which club climbed to 34. place on UEFA team rankings - its best ranking since 1992.

In Serbian SuperLeage club played 4 games, and won all 4 of them, conceding only one goal. Highlights of the month were Aleksandar Katai's hattrick in a 5–0 win against Novi Pazar and Andrej Đurić debut for the club in a 3–0 win against Kolubara. Club finished the month in the first place, tied with Partizan.

During the international break eight of the clubs first team players represented their national teams. Club's captain Milan Borjan made two caps for Canada in 2022 FIFA World Cup qualification and helped them qualify for the 2022 FIFA World Cup - their first world cup after 36 years. Aleksandar Dragović made two caps for Austria, who failed to qualify for the 2022 FIFA World Cup. With these two games he reached 100 caps for Austria, making him only second player in nation's history to do so. El Fardou Ben Nabouhane played one friendly game for Comoros. Miloš Gordić, Strahinja Eraković and Andrija Radulović received callups for Serbia U21 selection to play in 2023 UEFA European Under-21 Championship qualifications. Gordić had two caps and Eraković one. Lastly Nikola Stanković and Nemanja Motika were called up for Serbia U19 selection and both played in a single friendly game.

April
During the month in Serbian SuperLeage club played 5 games, winning 4 of them and drawing in third eternal derby against Partizan. They ended the month at the top of the table with 2 points ahead of Partizan and 4 games left to play.

In Serbian Cup quarter-final club eliminated TSC. For the semi-final Red Star was drawn to play another home game against Novi Pazar.

May
Club finished Serbian SuperLeage as a champions with a four wins during the May. This was clubs 8th title in Serbian SuperLeague and 33rd domestic league title.

In Serbian Cup club played semi final against FK Novi Pazar and final against Partizan and won both games. This was 5th Serbian Cup and 26th domestic cup title for the club.

On 26 May manager Dejan Stanković extended his contract with the club until the summer of 2025.

Players
Players and squad numbers last updated on 22 May 2022. Appearances include league matches only.Note: Flags indicate national team as has been defined under FIFA eligibility rules. Players may hold more than one non-FIFA nationality.

Note: SuperLiga imposes a requirements on under-21 players (marked as U21) and foreign players (marked as FGN). There must be at least one U21 and no more than four FGN players on the pitch at any time.

Pre-season and friendlies
Summer training camp in Austria

Winter training camp in Turkey

Competitions

Overall record

Serbian SuperLiga

Season results summary

Season results round by round

Regular season league table

Regular season matches

Championship round league table

Championship round matches

Serbian Cup

First round

Round of 16

Quarter-finals

Semi-finals

Final

UEFA Champions League

Second qualifying round

Third qualifying round

UEFA Europa League

Play-off round

Group stage

Round of 16

The draw for the round of 16 was held on 25 February 2022, 13:00 CET. The first legs was played on 10 March, and the second legs was played on 17 March 2022.

Squad

Squad statistics

|-
! colspan=14 style="background:red; color:white; text-align:center;"| Goalkeepers

|-
! colspan=14 style="background:red; color:white; text-align:center;"| Defenders

|-
! colspan=14 style="background:red; color:white; text-align:center;"| Midfielders

 

|-
! colspan=14 style="background:red; color:white; text-align:center;"| Forwards

|-
! colspan=14 style="background:red; color:white; text-align:center;"| Players transferred out during the season
|-

Goalscorers
Includes all competitive matches. The list is sorted by shirt number when total goals are equal.

Clean sheets
Includes all competitive matches. The list is sorted by shirt number when total clean sheets are equal.

Disciplinary record

Transfers

In

Out

Loan returns and promotions

Loan out

See also 
2021–22 KK Crvena zvezda season

Notes

References

Red Star Belgrade seasons
Red Star
Red Star
2021–22 UEFA Europa League participants seasons
Serbian football championship-winning seasons